Emeka Egbuka (born October 18, 2002) is an American football wide receiver for the Ohio State Buckeyes.

Early life and high school career
Egbuka grew up in DuPont, Washington and attended Steilacoom High School. He was named the Washington Gatorade Player of the Year as a junior after he caught 83 passes for 1,607 yards and 25 touchdowns and compiled 2,240 all-purpose yards with three punt return touchdowns and four rushing touchdowns. Egbuka was rated a five-star recruit and committed to play college football at Ohio State over offers from Oklahoma and Washington.

College career
Egbuka joined the Ohio State Buckeyes as an early enrollee in January 2021, forgoing his senior season at Steilacoom which had been moved to the spring due to Covid-19. He played in 11 games as a freshman and caught nine passes for 191 yards. He also returned 20 kickoffs for 580 yards and was named honorable mention All-Big Ten Conference.

Statistics

References

External links
Ohio State Buckeyes bio

Living people
Players of American football from Washington (state)
American football wide receivers
Ohio State Buckeyes football players
People from Steilacoom, Washington
2002 births